Teschendorf is a part of Burg Stargard in the district Mecklenburgische Seenplatte, in Mecklenburg-Vorpommern, Germany.

Villages in Mecklenburg-Western Pomerania